Direk Jayanama (January 18, 1905 – May 1, 1967) was a Thai diplomat and politician.

He was one of the civilian Promoters of the Siamese Revolution of 1932 that changed the country's form of government from absolute to constitutional monarchy. He was closely associated with Pridi Banomyong. In the government of Field Marshal Plaek Phibunsongkhram he served as Minister of Foreign Affairs, but resigned when Phibunsongkhram led Thailand into World War II alongside Japan. Direk became a member of the Free Thai Movement (Seri Thai) alongside Pridi, who fought for the full sovereignty of Thailand and against collaboration with Japan. After the end of war, he served as Minister of Justice, Finance, Foreign Affairs and Deputy Prime Minister in several short-lived cabinets. From 1949 to 1952 he was the first dean of the Faculty of Political Science, Thammasat University.

Notability
From 1938 to 1947, Direk served in many important posts in the Thai government during the early years of constitutional rule. During World War II, he held the post of Foreign Minister to become the Ambassador to Japan. He also held the posts of Deputy Prime Minister, Foreign Minister (multiple times), Justice Minister, and Finance Minister. He also served as the Thai Ambassador to the Court of St. James's (England), Germany and Finland.

In 1947, he was appointed ambassador in London, but resigned a few months later as a result of the Phibunite coup.

The Negotiator with Allies Power
Direk’s account is especially good on the Franco-Thai conflict of 1940; The invasion by Japan in 1941; The delicate relationship with Japan over 1942–1943; Financial affairs in the immediate postwar period; and the negotiations to rehabilitate Thailand with the Allied Powers, including becoming a member of the United Nations.

The Thammasat University

In 1949, Direk also founded the Thammasat University Faculty of Political Science. It offers undergraduate and graduate studies in three majors, politics and government, public administration, and international affairs. Many Thai provincial governors, mayors, leaders, and activists are graduates from this faculty. He then taught law at Thammasat University, and wrote texts on diplomacy and foreign affairs.

Family
Direk's younger brother was Pairote Jayanama, former Permanent Secretary of Foreign Affairs (who had 4 sons who eventually became ambassadors include Asda Jayanama, Surapong Jayanama), and Am Jayanama, an Air Force General at the time.

He was married to Khunying ML Pui, member of the aristocratic Nopawongse royal bloodline, and had 4 sons with her. One son, Wattana Jayanama, became an important figure during the establishment phase of the Bank of Thailand.

References

Further reading
Direk Jayanama. Thailand and World War II (2008) 575pp;

Direk Jayanama
Direk Jayanama
Direk Jayanama
Direk Jayanama
Direk Jayanama
Direk Jayanama
Direk Jayanama
Direk Jayanama
Direk Jayanama
Direk Jayanama
Direk Jayanama
Direk Jayanama
Direk Jayanama
Direk Jayanama
Direk Jayanama
Direk Jayanama
Direk Jayanama
Direk Jayanama
Direk Jayanama
1905 births
1967 deaths